Danyal Topatan (January 1, 1916 – September 26, 1975) was a Turkish-Armenian actor.

Topatan dropped out of his first year of middle school and entered the cinema with Dracula in Istanbul, which was filmed in 1953. He was known for his role in the film Topkapi. He acted in hundreds of different movies. Topatan died of lung cancer on 26 September 1975. He was buried at the Zincirlikuyu Cemetery.

Filmography

 "La cloche tibétaine" (1975) (TV series)
 Delisin (1975)
 Tokmak Nuri (1975)
 Yaşar Ne Yaşar Ne Yaşamaz (1974)
 Çirkin Dünya (1974)
 Destan (1973) 
 Büyük Bela (1973)
 Kara Şeytan (1973) 
 Dağ Kurdu (1973)
 Kambur (1973)
 Mevlana (1973)
 Irmak (1972)
 Kan ve Kin (1972) 
 Benimle Sevişir Misin? (1972)
 Sabu Hırsızlar Prensi (1972) 
 Bitirim (1972)
 Öldüren Örümcek (1972)
 Adanalı Kardeşler (1972)
 Allahaısmarladık Katil (1972)
 Süper Adam İstanbul'da (1972) 
 Cemo (1972)
 Ölmeyen Adam (1971)
 İşte Deve İşte Hendek (1971)
 Baybars, Asyanin Tek Atlısı (1971)
 Çirkin ve Cesur (1971)
 İntikam Kartalları (1971)
 Üç Kızgın Cengaver (1971)
 Önce Sev Sonra Öldür (1971)
 Keloğlan ve Yedi Cüceler (1971)
 Vurguncular (1971)
 Hayat Cehennemi - Hiç (1971)
 Belanın Kralı (1971)
 Gelin Kız (1971)
 Bir Teselli Ver (1971)
 İpini Boynunda Bil (1971)
 Malkoçoğlu Ölüm Fedaileri (1971)
 Kara Cellat (1971)
 Şeytana Uyduk Bir Kere (1971)
 Çeko (1970)
 Ceylan Emine (1970)
 İki Cesur Adam (1970)
 Erkek Gibi Ölenler (1970)
 Tarkan: Gümüş Eyer (1970)
 Altın Tabancalı Adam (1970)
 Casus Kıran - Yedi Canlı Adam (1970)
 Yanık Kezban (1970)
 Yedi Belalılar (1970)
 Öksüz Gülnaz (1970)
 Erkeklik Öldü mü Abiler (1970)
 Kralların Öfkesi (1970)
 Piyade Osman (1970)
 Yemen'de Bir Avuç Türk (1970)
 Kiralık Katiller (1970)
 On Kadına Bir Erkek (1970)
 Canlı Hedef (Kızım İçin) (1970) 
 Linç (1970) 
 Yaşamak İçin Öldüreceksin (1970)
 Yayla Kızı Gül Ayşe (1969)
 Ringo Vadiler Aslanı (1969) 
 Çifte Tabancalı Kabadayı (1969)
 Günahını Ödeyen Kadın (1969)
 Fato - Ya İstiklal Ya Ölüm (1969)
 Daga Çıkan Kız (1969)
 Demir Pençe Casuslar Savaşı (1969)
 Köprüden Geçti Gelin (1969)
 Tarkan (1969)  
 Demir Pençe (Korsan Adam) (1969)
 Serseri Kabadayı (1969)
 Çakırcalı Mehmet Efe (1969)
 Çile (1969)
 Ebu Müslim Horasanı (1969)
 Tarkan Camoka'ya Karşı (1969) 
 Fosforlu Cevriye (1969)
 Vatansızlar (1969)
 Beyaz Mendilim (1969)
 Zorro Kamçılı Süvari (1969) 
 Dişi Eşkıya (1969)
 Zorro'nun İntikamı (1969) 
 Abbase Sultan (1968)
 Seyyit Han (1968) 
 İngiliz Kemal (1968)
 Kızıl Maske (1968) 
 Pire Nuri (1968)
 Kaçak (1968) 
 Maskeli Beşler (1968)
 Camoka'nın Dönüsü (1968) 
 Maskeli Beşlerin Dönüşü (1968)
 Şeyh Ahmet (1968) 
 Sürtüğün Kızı (1967)
 Silahları Ellerinde Öldüler (1967)
 Kuduz Recep (1967)
 Benim Adım Kerim (1967)
 Harun Reşid'in Gözdesi (1967)
 Krallar Ölmez (1967)
 Gecelerin Kralı (1967)
 Düşman Aşıklar (1967)
 At Hırsızı Banus (1967)
 Kozanoğlu (1967) 
 Bizansı Titreten Yiğit (1967)
 Şark Yıldızı (1967)
 Balatlı Arif (1967)
 Eşkiya Celladı (1967)
 Killing Caniler Kralı (1967)
 Ah Güzel İstanbul (1966)
 Namusum İçin (1966)
 Senede Bir Gün (1966)
 Arslanların Dönüşü (1966)
 Kanun Benim (1966)
 Ölmeyen Aşk (1966)
 Karaoğlan - Camoka'nın İntikamı (1966)
 Hudutların Kanunu (1966)
 Yedi Dağın Aslanı (1966)
 Hazreti Süleyman ve Saba Melikesi (1966)
 Bir Millet Uyanıyor (1966)
 At Avrat Silah (1966)
 Kibar Haydut (Yalnız Adam) (1966)
 Seni Seviyorum (1966)
 Silahların Kanunu (1966)
 Son Darbe (1965)
 İçimizdeki Boşluk (1965)
 Akrep Kuyruğu (1965)
 Karaoğlan-Altay'dan Gelen Yiğit (1965)
 Yalancı (1965)
 Aşkım Silahımdır (1965)
 Haracıma Dokunma (1965)
 Dağların Oğlu (1965) 
 Korkusuzlar (1965)
 Krallar Kralı (1965)
 Artık Düşman Değiliz (1965)
 Kasımpaşalı Recep (1965)
 Sayılı Kabadayılar (1965)
 Yahya Peygamber (1965)
 Yaralı Kartal (1965)
 Şeytanın Kurbanları (1965)
 Sayılı Dakikalar (1965)
 Muradın Türküsü (1965)
 Günah Kadınları (1964)
 Topkapi (1964)
 Gurbet Kuşları (1964)
 Erkek Ali (1964)
 Abidik Gubidik (1964)
 Sahildeki Ceset (1964)
 Koçero (1964)
 Ağaçlar Ayakta Ölür (1964)
 Duvarlarin Ötesi (1964)
 Keşanli Ali Destanı (1964)
 Çapkın Kız (1963)
 Sabah Olmasın (1963)
 İki Gemi Yan Yana (1963)
 Vahşi Kedi (1962)
 Ölüme Yalnız Gidilir (1962)
 Seni Bekleyeceğim (1962)
 Cehenneme Çevrilen Cennet (1962)
 Harmandalı Efem Geliyor (1962)
 Bir Haydutu Sevdim (1962) (also served as writer and director)
 Can Mustafa (Yaralı Kuş) (1961)
 Kadın Asla Unutmaz (1961)
 Mor Sevda (1961)
 Sevimli Haydut (1961)
 Acı Zeytin (1961)
 İki Yetime (1961)
 Oğlum (1961)
 Divane (1960)
 Üsküdar İskelesi (1960)
 Karacaoğlan'ın Kara Sevdası (1959)
 Tütün Zamanı (1959)
 Alageyik (1958)
 Funda (1958)
 Meçhul Kahramanlar (1958)
 Lejyon Dönüşü (1957)
 Yangın (1956)
 Beyaz Mendil (1955)
 Drakula İstanbul'da (1953)
 Çete (1950)

References

1916 births
1975 deaths
People from Tarsus, Mersin
Turkish male film actors
Turkish people of Armenian descent
Deaths from lung cancer in Turkey
Burials at Zincirlikuyu Cemetery